Little Charlie & the Nightcats was an American electric blues and swing revival combo, active from 1976-2008. Several members reformed as Rick Estrin & The Nightcats.

Biography
Charles Baty (1953–2020) was studying mathematics at University of California Berkeley when he and Rick Estrin (born 1949) formed Little Charlie & the Nightcats in 1976. Their first album, All the Way Crazy, was issued in 1987. It includes the songs "Poor Tarzan", "Suicide Blues" and "When Girls Do It". The following album, Disturbing the Peace (1988), included "That's My Girl", "My Money's Green", "She's Talking" and "Nervous". They began touring in the United States and internationally. They played at the San Francisco Blues Festival in 1980 and 1982, the Montreal International Jazz Festival, the San Diego Street Scene, Seattle's Bumbershoot Festival and the Juneau Jazz & Classics Festival in 2002.

Their 1993 album, Night Vision, was produced by Joe Louis Walker, who also performed on it. The album included "My Next Ex-Wife," which won a W.C. Handy Award for Song of the Year. The band's drummer, Dobie Strange, was replaced by June Core in 1996.

In early 2008, Baty announced he was entering "soft" retirement and no longer toured with the band, except for reunion tours and shows in Europe and select North American festivals. Baty performed with JW-Jones at the Mont Tremblant Blues Festival, Ottawa Bluesfest, and Piazza Blues in Bellinzona, Switzerland, in July 2009. Estrin continued with the band, which was renamed Rick Estrin & The Nightcats. Baty was replaced on guitar by Chris "Kid" Andersen (born 1980), originally from Telemark, Norway. Andersen had backed Charlie Musselwhite and Terry Hanck, and had fronted his own band.

Baty's most recent blues recording was as a guest on JW-Jones's Bluelisted (2008), an album which marked the first time in his career that he documented his harmonica playing on a recording and the first time he and another West Coast blues musician, Junior Watson, had recorded together on the same tracks.

In 2013, Estrin was nominated for a Blues Music Award in the category B.B. King Entertainer. He was nominated again in 2014 for the same award, and the ensemble was nominated for Band of the Year.

Charlie Baty died on March 6, 2020, aged 66, in Vacaville, California following a heart attack.

Selected discography

References

External links
Rick Estrin & The Nightcats
Alligator Records review
Nightcats photos

American blues musical groups
West Coast blues musicians
Alligator Records artists